The National Institute of Statistics (INS) is a Romanian government agency which is responsible for collecting national statistics, in fields such as geography, the economy, demographics and society. The institute is also responsible for conducting Romania's census every ten years, with the latest census being organised in 2022.

Leadership
The head of the NIS is currently Tudorel Andrei, while the three vice-presidents are:

Elena Mihaela Iagăr, in charge of economic and social statistics
Marian Chivu, in charge of national accounts and the dissemination of statistical information
Beatrix Gered, in charge of IT activities and statistical infrastructure

History
Romania's first official statistics body was the Central Office for Administrative Statistics (Oficiului Central de Statistică Administrativă), established on July 12, 1859, under the reign of Alexandru Ioan Cuza. The organisation, one of the first national statistics organisations in Europe, conducted its first public census between 1859 and 1860.

The Romanian national statistics organisation was known under various names throughout the country's history, as can be seen in the table below:

See also
Demographic history of Romania
Romanian Statistical Yearbook

External links
 National Institute of Statistics - official site

Government of Romania
Romania